Halloweentown II: Kalabar's Revenge is a 2001 Disney Channel Original Movie released for the Halloween season.  It is the second installment in the Halloweentown series.

Plot
Marnie has just spent two years with her grandmother Aggie. While hosting a mortal neighborhood Halloween party at their house, Marnie tries to impress a cute new boy, Kal, by showing him Aggie's magically-hidden room with a spellbook in it . Soon Aggie notices unwelcome magical symptoms. She and Marnie travel to Halloweentown to investigate and to fix the problem before the portal between Halloweentown and the mortal world, open only on Halloween, closes at midnight.

They discover that the whole town has been turned into a  black-and-white world, and that the inhabitants have been turned into dreary, discolored, monotonous humans. The victims include Marnie's goblin friend Luke. Aggie diagnoses this as the "Grey Spell". Aggie contacts her grandson Dylan back home for a spell from her spell book. Dylan and Sophie discover the book is missing. Marnie and Aggie learn that Kal is actually a warlock and the son of their enemy Kalabar (from the previous film). They learn that Kal stole Aggie's spell book to limit her ability to hinder his attempt to complete his father's revenge both on Halloweentown and on the mortal world. Aggie searches for a spare copy of her spell book at her house in Halloweentown, but it is missing and she despairs. During a conversation with Aggie, Marnie inadvertently reverts Luke back to his goblin form. Unable to explain the spell's reversal, the group soon believes that it is temporary.

The trio travel to the lair of the well-known junk-magnet of the universe, Gort, who acquires lost items from both realms. He had been discolored by the Grey Spell and sold most of his junk. The group becomes trapped in Gort's house. Aggie loses her color as well and sorts through missing socks with Gort. Marnie uses time travel to go back to Gort's house before the Grey Spell happened. When Marnie and Luke arrive, they learn that Gort had sold the spare spell book to Kalabar about 50 years prior. By remembering what things Marnie had been hastefully saying back when Luke returned to his normal goblin form, they realize that the Grey Spell can be reverted by saying "Trapa", which is "Apart" spelled backwards.

Kal, having enspelled Halloweentown into a monochrome caricature of the mortal world, is now at work enspelling the mortal world into a monster movie caricature of Halloweentown. Sophie and Dylan realize that Alex, believed to be Kal's father, is actually a golem intended to distract their mother Gwen at a high-school Halloween party. Kal puts his spell into effect, turning the party guests into the monsters they are dressed as, resulting in chaos. Dylan and Sophie hide from the monster humans including their mother.

Marnie frees Aggie, but they are too late - the portal to the mortal world closes, trapping them in Halloweentown. Marnie refuses to accept they are locked in. She contacts her siblings and they develop a new spell that forces the portal between Halloweentown and the mortal world to reopen permanently. Kal angrily confronts Marnie, who mocks him and demands the spell book. Kal produces slimy living-serpent vines of dark magic and uses them to take both spell books in an attempt to prove his own superiority, which fails when Marnie takes them from him. Kal is sent away by the vines and the family breaks his spells in the mortal world and in Halloweentown. Kal will return for his revenge.

Cast
 Kimberly J. Brown as Marnie Piper, a 15-year-old witch who goes on a journey to undo Halloweentown's gray spell.
 Debbie Reynolds as Agatha "Aggie" Cromwell, the grandmother of Marnie, Dylan, and Sophie, and mother of Gwen. She is a witch.
 Judith Hoag as Gwen Piper, the mother of Marnie, Dylan, and Sophie.
 Joey Zimmerman as Dylan Piper, the 14-year-old brother of Marnie and Sophie.
 Emily Roeske as Sophie Piper, the 9-year-old sister of Marnie and Dylan. 
 Phillip Van Dyke as Luke, the goblin. He helps Marnie on her journey.
 Daniel Kountz as Kal, the Son of Kalabar.
 Xantha Radley as Astrid, an elf.
 Peter Wingfield as Alex, a golem that Kal made of frogs.
 Blu Mankuma as Gort, the garbage collector.
 Richard Side as Benny, the skeleton taxi driver. He was previously voiced by Rino Romano in the first film.
 Jessica Lucas as Cindy, Marnie's friend who dresses as a vampire for Halloween.

Production

Casting
In a 2020 Galaxy Con question-and answer panel, Daniel Kountz revealed he had four or five auditions for the film.

See also 
 Halloweentown series
 Halloweentown (1998)
 Halloweentown High (2004)
 Return to Halloweentown  (2006)

References

External links

 

Halloweentown (film series)
Television sequel films
Films shot in Vancouver
2001 television films
2001 films
2000s English-language films
Films about witchcraft
Films directed by Mary Lambert
Films scored by Mark Mothersbaugh
American sequel films
American films about revenge
American films about Halloween
2000s monster movies
American monster movies
2000s American films